Lögdeå is a locality situated in Nordmaling Municipality, Västerbotten County, Sweden. It had 394 inhabitants in 2010 and an area of 116 hectares.

References 

Populated places in Västerbotten County
Populated places in Nordmaling Municipality